The Kiliansteich (literally "St. Kilian's Pond") is one of the oldest reservoirs in Germany. The reservoir is located near Straßberg (Harz) in the German state of Saxony-Anhalt and supplies drinking water. It impounds the Büschengraben stream. The lake is part of the heritage area (Flächendenkmal) of the Lower Harz Pond and Ditch System.

The reservoir has a rockfill dam with a watertight clay core that sits on a shale bedrock.

History 
Originally there were four small ponds in a row on the site of the present-day reservoir that had been built for the mining industry. Two of those were broken in 1901 and 1944 and all were in a poor condition. As a result, from 1989-1994 a new, higher dam was built at the site of the lowest dam; the two middle ponds were removed and the upper one, the Upper Kilian Pond (Oberer Kiliansteich), built in 1703, was upgraded into a pre-dam (Vorsperre).

Originally laid as a drinking water reservoir, the lake is used today for flood and drought protection.

The dam on the original "Lower Kilian Pond" (Unterer Kiliansteich) was about 10 m high and had a retaining capacity of 165,000 m³. During the course of renovation the old wooden bottom outlet was salvaged on 25 September 1990 as the result on an initiative by Erika and Siegfried Lorenz. Following long-term conservation work at the Harzwasserwerken in Clausthal-Zellerfeld, who paid for the cost of transports and conservation, it was returned on 19 August 2010 to Straßberg. The wooden raceway is now a museum piece in the Glasebach Pit.

See also
 List of dams in Germany

Sources 
Talsperren in Sachsen-Anhalt, Autorenkollegium, Hrsg. Talsperrenmeisterei des Landes Sachsen-Anhalt 1994

External links 

 
 Kiliansteich Dam
 Kiliansteich Dam (2 photos)
 Saxony-Anhalt Department of the Environment: Dams according to § 88 of the State Water Law

RKiliansteich 
Buildings and structures completed in the 17th century
Infrastructure completed in 1994
Lower Harz Pond and Ditch System
Reservoirs in Saxony-Anhalt